Bacalhau com natas (literally as "cod with double cream") is a popular way of cooking salted cod (bacalhau) in Portugal. This dish consists of baked cod in the oven layered with onions, diced fried potatoes (or leftover cooked potatoes) and double cream, usually seasoned with nutmeg and white pepper.

This is a simple dish to prepare and very popular both at home and in restaurants; since it does not require a great deal of codfish it can be a way to use up leftover codfish or make a codfish dish for many people.

See also
 List of casserole dishes

References

Portuguese cuisine
Fish dishes
Casserole dishes
Potato dishes
Milk dishes